In networking, multipacket reception refers to the capability of networking nodes for decoding/demodulating signals from a number of source nodes concurrently. In wireless communications, Multipacket reception is achieved using physical layer technologies like orthogonal CDMA, MIMO and space–time codes.

See also 
 MIMO –  Wireless communication systems having multiple antennas at both transmitter and receiver.
 CDMA –  Code division multiple access

External links 
http://acronyms.thefreedictionary.com/MPR

Computer networking